Rockville is an unincorporated community in Adams County, in the U.S. state of Ohio.

History
Rockville was laid out in 1830, and named for the quarries near the original town site.

References

Unincorporated communities in Adams County, Ohio
1830 establishments in Ohio
Populated places established in 1830
Unincorporated communities in Ohio